The  girls' singles competition of the 2020 Winter Youth Olympics was held at the Lausanne Skating Arena on 11 January (short program) and 13 January 2020 (free skate).

Results

Short program 
The short program was held on 11 January at 16:10.

Free skating 
The free skating was held on 13 January at 14:30.

Overall

References 

Girls' singles